Roberto Piazza (May 10, 1945, Le Havre, France) better known by his stage name as Little Bob is a French rock musician with strong blues and rhythm 'n' blues influences. 

Lemmy from Motörhead features on the album Ringolevio (1987).

In 2011, the vocalist Roberto Piazza alias Little Bob plays himself in the movie Le Havre directed by Aki Kaurismäki, in competition at the 2011 edition of Festival de Cannes.

Discography

Studio albums 

Little Bob Story
 1976 : High Time
 1977 : Off The Rails
 1977 : Living in the Fast Lane
 1978 : Come See Me
 1980 : Light of My Town
 1982 : Vacant Heart
 1984 : Too Young To Love Me
 1985 : ...Wanderers...Followers...Lovers...
 1987 : Ringolevio
Little Bob
 1989 : Rendez-Vous in Angel City
 1991 : Alive or nothing
 1993 : Lost Territories
 1997 : Blue stories
 2002 : Libero
 2005 : The Gift
 2009 : Time To Blast
Little Bob Blues Bastards
 2012 : Break Down The Walls
 2015 : Howlin'''
 2018 : New Day Coming Live albums 

 1978 : Live in London 2003 : Rock On Riff On Roll On Move On – Live 2003 2005 : Live in the Dockland 2005 : Live in London (reedition)

 Compilations 

 1977 : Little Bob Story 1991 : High Time + Like Rock'n Roll 1999 : One Story Volume 1 2000 : One Story Volume 2 2011 : Wild And Deep – Best Of 1989/2009 Featurings 

 1999 : Tribute to Lee Brilleaux 2000 : Blues against racism 2002 : Roots and new 2002 2002 : A South Louisiana soul sensation Bibliography 

 Little Bob et Christian Eudeline, La Story, Éditions Denoël, coll. X-treme, 2010 , 251 p.
 Stories of Little Bob, histoires pour Roberto''.  Jean-Bernard Pouy, Frédéric Prilleux, Jean-Noël Levavasseur, Jean-Luc Manet, Stéphane Le Carre, Stéphane Pajot, Sylvie Rouch, Serguei Dounovtez et al., Editions Krakoën. www.krakoen.fr. April 2013.

External links 

 
 Vidéo interview  – September 2007
 Vidéo interview  – October 2009
 Interview for  radio RDL Colmar
 Vidéo interview  – July 2011

1945 births
French rock musicians
Living people
Musicians from Le Havre
French male film actors